Arthur J. Dewey is an American teacher, writer, translator and commentator with particular distinction as a New Testament scholar and specialist on the Historical Jesus. He is a professor of Theology in the University Scholars honors department at Xavier University in Cincinnati, Ohio, where he began teaching in 1980.

Dewey is co-founder of the Healing Deadly Memories Program, which addresses the "question of anti-Semitism in the New Testament. He has also been involved with the controversial Jesus Seminar, a group of academics dedicated to researching the factual Jesus.

Education
Dewey holds an A.B. from Boston College, an M.Div. from the Weston Jesuit School of Theology, and a Th.D. from Harvard University.

Selected works

Thesis

Books

 - general publication of his Ph.D. thesis

References

American theologians
Living people
Harvard Divinity School alumni
American biblical scholars
New Testament scholars
Xavier University faculty
Boston College School of Theology and Ministry alumni
Year of birth missing (living people)

Members of the Jesus Seminar